Baikal Airlines Flight 130 was a scheduled domestic passenger flight from Irkutsk to Moscow that crashed on 3 January 1994. The plane involved in the crash was a Tupolev Tu-154 operated by Russian airline Baikal Airlines. The plane was carrying 115 passengers and 9 crew members and was en route to Moscow when one of the engines suddenly burst into flames. The crew then tried to return to Irkutsk, but lost control of the plane and crashed into a dairy farm near the town of Mamony. All 124 people on board and one person on the ground were killed in the crash. The accident was judged to have been caused by a foreign object entering the engine and slicing several crucial lines to the airplane's hydraulic and fuel systems.

Accident
Flight 130 took off from Irkutsk International Airport at 11:59 local time. The Tupolev Tu-154 was operated by a crew of nine, including Captain Gennadiy S. Padukov (with over 16,000 hours' flight time), first officer A. G. Zhavoronkov (over 14,000 hours), navigator V. I. Molnar, flight engineer Ilya Petrovich Karpov (over 13,000 hours), purser O. V. Likhodyevsky, and four flight attendants.

The flight experienced trouble before it even took off. It took the crew nearly 17 minutes to start the engines, and they received multiple warnings that there were problems with the starter on the No. 2 engine, but ignored them as false alarms. The cockpit reference manual contained no guidance for the crew on how to respond to the engine starter warnings. The crew proceeded to take off without realizing that the No. 2 engine starter was still engaged.

The starter had continued to operate at high revolutions (over 40,000 rpm) with open air bleed valves from the engines, resulting in a critical failure of the starter. The turbine's fan disk flew apart, sending shrapnel into the No. 2 engine and compartment area. This ultimately led to the destruction of the left engine's fuel lines and hydraulic lines. The fuel supply for the fuel injectors stopped, which led to the ignition of fuel in the No. 2 engine. Thus, a fire broke out that became uncontrollable.

After receiving a fire alarm in engine No. 2, the crew disconnected the autopilot and applied all the fire-extinguishing system lines. This failed to stop the fire, and the pilot turned towards Irkutsk and requested an emergency landing. The plane's flight controls failed because of the lack of hydraulic fluid, and although the crew attempted to keep pressure in the hydraulic lines, they were not able to prevent a catastrophe.

At 12:07 local time, co-pilot Zhavoronkov reported a complete loss of control. The cockpit and the first passenger cabin were destroyed, and the second passenger cabin and tail were propelled  beyond the initial point of impact. All 115 passengers and 9 crew members on board were killed. The dairy farm was destroyed. At the time of the disaster there were 2 people in the building—one was killed, another injured, and several dozen cattle were killed. A total of 125 people died. From 125 people who were killed in the disaster, only 74 were identified.

Investigation
The Russian investigation revealed that during Flight 130's take off, the Tupolev Tu-154's No. 2 engine failed. Investigators noted that the plane had been involved in a similar incident during a flight to Guangzhou, China, in which the No. 2 engine failed. Due to the incident, the crew had to conduct an emergency landing. They later wrote a post-flight complaint, in which they noted the "unsatisfactory work" of the engine.

During the day of the disaster, the crew could only turn on the engine after their fifth attempt, as the last four attempts had failed to light the engine. The CVR recorded the conversation between the captain and the crew in the cockpit, discussing the faulty engine. Two minutes before take-off, one of the crew stated:

"Tell the engineer who prepared the engines that the engines are very poorly prepared. They won't start."

Four kilometers from the airport, the No. 2 engine starter "collapsed". According to investigators, the destruction was caused due to foreign objects. A foreign object, presumably a fragment of the casing of the APU gas collector which was located under the control flap of the starter, entered the engine and sliced the fuel lines, hydraulic lines, and oil lines. The tightly closed damper of the turbine of the starter continued to untwist during its take-off, which caused the detachment. Added by the operation of the engine, which was operating over its permitted maximum rpm, this caused the destruction of the engine which led to the subsequent fire and loss of control.

See also 
 Caspian Airlines Flight 7908, similar crash involving Tu-154 which lost control following an exploded turbine disc that managed to slice off the aircraft's hydraulic lines.
 United Airlines Flight 232. similar crash involving a McDonnell Douglas DC-10, which crash landed at Sioux Gateway Airport following loss of hydraulics due to an engine explosion.

References

External links
 Aviation Safety accident profile
 Video of the crash site from YouTube

1994 disasters in Russia
Aviation accidents and incidents in 1994
Aviation accidents and incidents in Russia
Accidents and incidents involving the Tupolev Tu-154
January 1994 events in Russia
Airliner accidents and incidents involving uncontained engine failure
Irkutsk